"Can't Let Go" is an R&B–soul song written by American singer-songwriter Anthony Hamilton and songwriter/producer Mark Batson for Hamilton's third album, Ain't Nobody Worryin' (2005). Released in as the album's lead single in October 2005 and produced by Batson, it debuted at number seventy-six on the Hot R&B/Hip-Hop Songs the week of November 5, 2005; there, it had a whopping sixty-eight-week chart run, peaking at number thirteen. On the Billboard Hot 100, where it entered at number ninety-three the week of March 18, 2006, the stay was much more brief (nineteen weeks), as was its peak position (number seventy-one).

Charts

Weekly charts

Year-end charts

References

2005 singles
Anthony Hamilton (musician) songs
Songs written by Mark Batson
Song recordings produced by Mark Batson
2005 songs
Arista Records singles
Torch songs
Soul ballads
Contemporary R&B ballads
2000s ballads
Songs written by Anthony Hamilton (musician)